Rafael Nazaryan (born on 26 March 1975 in Yerevan, Soviet Union) is a retired Armenian football midfielder and a current manager. He was a member of the Armenia national team and participated in 23 international matches, scoring 1 goal sin an away 1998 World Cup qualification match against Portugal on 20 August 1997. In February 2011 Rafael was appointed as a head coach of the Armenia national youth football team.

References

External links
 
 

Living people
1975 births
Footballers from Yerevan
Armenian footballers
Association football midfielders
Armenia international footballers
Armenian expatriate footballers
Expatriate footballers in Moldova
Expatriate footballers in Belarus
FC Ararat Yerevan players
FC Tiraspol players
FC Pyunik players
FC Mika players
FC Urartu players
FC Darida Minsk Raion players
Ulisses FC players
Armenian Premier League players
Armenian football managers
FC Urartu managers
FC Pyunik managers